Kevin Ryan Smith (born December 17, 1986) is a former American football running back.  He played college football for the University of Central Florida (UCF), and received consensus All-American honors.  Smith was picked by the Detroit Lions in the third round of the 2008 NFL Draft, and played for the Lions for five seasons. He is the current running backs coach at Miami.

Early years
Smith attended Southridge High School in Miami, Florida.  In football, he was a three-year letterman, a two-time All-Dade County selection as both a running back and a safety, and as a junior, rushed for 1,125 yards and 15 touchdowns.

College career
Smith attended the University of Central Florida, where he played for the UCF Knights football team from 2004 to 2007.  He had a standout college career as a Knight, becoming UCF's all-time leading rusher after just three seasons (2005–07). He started 34 out of 36 games for the Knights, establishing new career records with 905 carries for 4,864 yards (5.37 avg) and 45 touchdowns. His 4,864 yards rank second in Conference USA history. His 180 points scored in 2007 rank fourth on the NCAA season-record chart. During his junior campaign Smith set a major college record of 450 rushing attempts, topping the old mark of 405 carries by Marcus Allen (USC) in 1981 and falling just 62 yards shy of setting the NCAA season-rushing record of 2,628 yards set by former Lions great, Barry Sanders (Oklahoma State) in 1988.

Early in his last season, Smith was touted as a dark horse candidate for the Heisman trophy, and ended up finishing in eighth place with 55 total points and three first-place votes to become only the second UCF player (after  Daunte Culpepper) to receive Heisman votes.

He was also the first consensus All-American from UCF, being selected to almost every 2007 All-American First-team, including SI.com's.

College statistics

Source:

Professional career

Pre-Draft
Smith ran 40-yard dash times of 4.45 and 4.47 seconds at his Pro Day.

He also achieved a 33.5" vertical jump and benched 225 lbs. 15 times.  Smith was projected as a third- to fourth-round pick.

Detroit Lions
Smith was drafted by the Detroit Lions after they traded up with the Miami Dolphins for the first pick of the third round of the 2008 NFL Draft. He signed a 3-year, $1.79 million contract on July 22.

After an impressive preseason showing, Smith was named the starting running back for the Lions for the 2008 season. Smith was backed by former Cincinnati Bengals star running back Rudi Johnson, whom the Lions had signed just days before the first game of the season. Smith was benched after week four and was briefly replaced by Johnson, before winning back the starting spot for the duration of the season.

In 2008, Smith led the Lions in rushing attempts (238), rushing yards (976; fourth in the league among rookie rushers), rushing average (4.1) and rushing touchdowns (8; third-highest tally by a rookie in team history).

In Week 8 of the 2009 season against the St. Louis Rams Smith tackled James Butler off an interception in the end zone for a safety after Butler ran out and then ran back in the end zone.

On March 3, 2011, the Lions declined to tender an offer to Smith, making him an unrestricted free agent for the upcoming NFL season. However, on November 7, he was re-signed by Detroit. The move became necessary after Jahvid Best was sidelined following his second concussion of the year. On November 20, Smith ran for 140 yards rushing on 16 carries and 61 yards on four receptions. He ran for two touchdowns and caught another as the Lions came back from a 17-point deficit to defeat the Carolina Panthers 49-35. On November 24, he was carted off the sidelines after a non-contact injury to his lower leg during the second quarter, it was later revealed that he had a mild ankle sprain with an undetermined return date. After missing several games in December, Kevin Smith returned to the field  in week 16 of the 2011 season and found the end zone once through the air and once on the ground as the Lions defeated the Chargers 38-10. Smith’s second touchdown, a 6-yard run in the third quarter, gave the Lions 51 touchdowns on the season, establishing a new franchise high. Smith finished the game with 15 carries for 49 yards and two catches for 12 for a combined 61 yards of offense.

See also
 List of NCAA major college football yearly rushing leaders
 List of NCAA major college football yearly scoring leaders

References

External links
 Detroit Lions bio
 UCF Knights bio

1986 births
Living people
American football running backs
Detroit Lions players
UCF Knights football players
UCF Knights football coaches
Florida Atlantic Owls football coaches
Ole Miss Rebels football coaches
All-American college football players
Miami Southridge Senior High School alumni
Players of American football from Miami
Sports coaches from Miami
Players of Canadian football from Miami